An election to Offaly County Council took place on 23 May 2014 as part of that year's Irish local elections. 19 councillors were elected from three electoral divisions by PR-STV voting for a five-year term of office, a reduction of 2 seats from the previous election in 2009. In addition Birr Town Council, Edenderry Town Council and Tullamore Town Council were all abolished.

Fianna Fáil remained the largest party after the elections winning 8 Council seats. Sinn Féin won 3 seats and in terms of vote share also became the second largest party. Fine Gael, by contrast, had a poor set of results and lost half of their Council seats. Independents make up the remainder of the membership of the Council.

Results by party

Results by Electoral Area

Birr

Edenderry

Tullamore

References

Changes since Election
† In March 2015 Birr Independent Cllr John Leahy became a founder of the Renua party.
†† Sinn Féin's Carol Nolan was elected as a TD for Offaly in the 2016 Irish general election. Sean Maher was co-opted to fill the vacancy.
††† Tullamore Fianna Fáil Cllr Sinead Dooley resigned her seat on 3 July 2017 as she had been appointed Asst. CEO of Irish Rural Link. On 19 September 2017 Tony McCormack was co-opted to fill the vacancy.
†††† Edenderry Independent Cllr Noel Cribbin joined Fine Gael on 8 November 2018.
††††† Edenderry Sinn Féin Cllr Martin O'Reilly announced on 10 November 2018 he was resigning his seat following his appointment as a primary school teacher. On 21 January 2019 Alan Daly was co-opted to fill the vacancy.

External links

2014 Irish local elections
2014